The Attorney General of the Confederate States of America was a member of the Confederate cabinet. The office of Attorney General of the Confederate States was created by the statute which established the Department of Justice. By the establishing statute, it was "the duty of the Attorney General to prosecute and conduct all suits in the Supreme Court, in which the Confederate States [was] concerned, and to give his advice and opinion upon questions of law, when required by the President of the Confederate States, or when requested by any of the heads of departments, touching any matters that may concern their departments on subjects before them." In this respect, his duties were the same as those of the United States Attorney General. But additionally, he had "supervisory power over the accounts of the marshals, clerks and officers of all the courts of the Confederate States, and all claims against the Confederate States." The Supreme Court was never established because of "fierce opposition" by white supremacists to a federal court that could abolish slavery.

Though the United States had established their office of Attorney General by the Judiciary Act of 1789, this act establishing the Confederate States Department of Justice predated and preceded the establishment of the United States Department of Justice by almost a decade, making it an earlier Department of Justice that was not in the United States and that failed to create a Supreme Court .

List of attorneys general

References

Bibliography

External links
Political Graveyard

Attorney General
1861 establishments in the Confederate States of America